Leo Junior/Senior High School is an East Allen County Schools high school located in Leo-Cedarville, Indiana.

It serves: Leo-Cedarville and Grabill.

Athletics 
Leo currently competes in the Northeast Eight Conference. They were previously in the Allen County conference and left in 2015. In addition to the typical IHSAA sanctioned sports they also have a rugby team, boys and girls lacrosse, and one of the 33 Ice Hockey teams that competes in the Indiana State High School Hockey Association.

Notable alumni
 Jon Neuhouser, All-State Basketball Player, Played for Butler University and was named  Midwestern Collegiate Conference Player of the Year in 1997
 Cameron Newbauer, Head Women's Basketball Coach, University of Florida
 Mark Souder, United States Representative, Indiana, District 3 (1995-2010)
 Mike Augustyniak, former professional football player, New York Jets, (1981-1983) 
 Andy Bayer, professional Track and Field Athlete

See also
 List of high schools in Indiana
 Northeast Eight Conference

References

External links
 Leo Junior/Senior High School website
 East Allen County Schools website

Public high schools in Indiana
Schools in Allen County, Indiana
Public middle schools in Indiana